Nymphes des bois, also known as La Déploration de Johannes Ockeghem, is a lament composed by Josquin des Prez on the occasion of the death of his predecessor Johannes Ockeghem in February 1497. The piece, based on a poem by Jean Molinet and including the funeral text Requiem Aeternam as a cantus firmus, is in five voices. In the first of its two parts Josquin cleverly mimics the contrapuntal style of Ockeghem. This chanson is one of Josquin's best-known works, and often considered one of the most haunting and moving memorial works ever penned.

References

Compositions by Josquin des Prez
Funerary and memorial compositions
Composer tributes (classical music)